Shyam Sundar Besra is an Indian writer of Santali and Hindi. He is also a civil servant from West Bengal. He won the prestigious Sahitya Akademi Award in 2018. His pen name is Jiwirarec.

Personal life
Besra was born on 12 February 1961 in Ramkanali, Purulia, West Bengal, but his native was in Godda. He completed his M.A. in Hindi literature and M.A. in Santhali in 1987. He is the chief inspector of ticket of Eastern Railway Zone's Asansol Division.

Literary work
Besra was awarded Sahitya Akademi Award in 2018 for his novel Marom. Three of his major works are Dullar Khatir, Damin Reyak Judasi Kahani Ko and Damin Kulhi, out of which two are part of syllabus for postgraduate courses in Sido Kanhu Murmu University.

Besra has been associated with All India Radio Bhagalpur, Ranchi and Kolkata. He has also served as the advisory board member for five years in Santali Sahitya Akademi, New Delhi.

Awards
 Dr. Ambedkar Fellowshp Award – 1992
 Sammanvaye Shree – 2004
 Rashtriya Sikhar Samman – 2014
 Sahitya Akademi – 2018

References

External links
 Sahitya Akademi award Railway T.T.E
 Railway Employee conferred Sahitya Akademi award

Living people
1961 births
People from Purulia district
Recipients of the Sahitya Akademi Award in Santali
Indian civil servants
 Writers from West Bengal